George A. Kelly (April 16, 1883 – April 1969) was an American football player and coach. He was an alumnus of the University of Detroit and Kentucky State University. He later practiced law in Detroit in a partnership with Alex J. Groesbeck.

Coaching career
Kelly was the head football at the University of Detroit Mercy .  He held that position for three seasons, from 1907 until 1910. His coaching record at Detroit was 7–5–2.

Head coaching record

References

1883 births
1969 deaths
American football ends
American football quarterbacks
Detroit Titans football coaches
Detroit Titans football players
Kentucky State University alumni
Michigan lawyers
Players of American football from Detroit
20th-century American lawyers
Coaches of American football from Michigan